Fiesta is an American Technicolor musical-drama film released by Metro-Goldwyn-Mayer in 1947, starring Esther Williams, Ricardo Montalbán, Mary Astor and Cyd Charisse. The film was directed by Richard Thorpe and written by George Bruce and Lester Cole.

The story focuses on Mario Morales (Montalbán), a bullfighter who wants to be a composer, and his twin sister, Maria Morales (Williams), who wants to be a bullfighter even though she is a woman.

The film was shot on location in Puebla, Mexico. This was Montalbán's first credited role in a Hollywood film, and resulted in him being offered a contract by the studio. It was also the first of three films pairing Williams and Montalbán, the other two being On an Island with You (1948) and Neptune's Daughter (1949).

Fiesta was the first time Williams's name was billed above the title.

Plot summary
Retired matador Antonio Morales is anxious when his wife gives birth, disappointed when the baby turns out to be a girl, then thrilled when a twin brother is born. He names them Mario and Maria.

As the children grow up, Antonio's wife dreads the idea of her son facing the danger of becoming a bullfighter, particularly inasmuch as Mario has an artistic side to his nature, an affinity for music. Maria, meanwhile, becomes quite expert in the ring, taught by her father's right-hand man, Chato Vasquez.

As a gift on their 21st birthday, Maria honors her brother by getting a copy of Mario's new music composition to Maximino Contreras, a famed orchestra conductor. Maximino, thoroughly impressed, pays a call on the Morales family just before Mario's first bullfight. Antonio prefers not to distract his son prior to entering the ring, so he promises to pass along Maximino's personal regards later. But he does not.

Before a second bullfight, Mario is approached by Maximino, who wonders why he never responded to his previous invitation to meet. Realizing that his father ignored it, Mario angrily walks out of the ring, disappointing spectators and infuriating his father, who feels the family's honor has been disgraced.

Mario subsequently disappears. Maximino has his composition played on the radio in hopes it will draw him out of hiding, while Maria, with the same goal and to save his reputation, disguises herself as Mario and continues on the bullfighting circuit in his place. He eventually returns, but when Maria sees him in the audience she is distracted and almost killed; Mario intervenes to save her life. The incident leads their father to support Mario's pursuit of a life in music instead of bullfighting.

Cast
 Esther Williams as Maria Morales
 Ricardo Montalbán as Mario Morales
 Fortunio Bonanova as Antonio Morales
 Mary Astor as Señora Morales
 Akim Tamiroff as Chato Vasquez
 John Carroll as Jose 'Pepe' Ortega
 Cyd Charisse as Conchita
 Hugo Haas as Maximino Contreras
 Jean Van as Maria Morales, as a child
 Joey Preston as Mario Morales, as a child
 Frank Puglia as Doctor
 Los Bocheros as The Basque Singers
 Alan Napier as The Tourist

Soundtrack
 Fantasia Mexicana
 based on El Salon Mexico
 Music by Aaron Copland
 Music Adapted and Orchestrated by Johnny Green
 Piano soloist André Previn
 La Bamba
 Written by Luis Martínez Serrano
  Jarabe Tapatío (The Mexican Hat Dance)
 Traditional
 La luna enamorada
 Written by Angel Ortiz De Villajos, Miriano Bolanos, Recio Leocadio and Martinez Durango
 Romeria Vasca
 Written and Performed by Los Bocheros
 La barca de oro
 Traditional

Production
In March 1945, producer Jack Cummings announced his next film would be Fiesta Brava ("Wonderful Holiday") with Esther Williams. It was based on a story that George Bruce had come up with after a two-month holiday in Mexico.

In September 1945, MGM announced Richard Thorpe would direct with filming to start in October. The same month Ricardo Montalban, married to Loretta Young's sister, was announced as Williams' co star.

The film took longer than expected because Thorpe decided that he did not want the bulls killed. However, this led to the bulls attacking the stuntmen, four of them ending up in the hospital, and two of them barely surviving after being gored in the groin due to infections caused by the dirt on the bulls' horns. (Williams was doubled by men. After years swimming, she had broad shoulders, a flat backside, and a different body build from that of a bullfighter and a visible difference on film.) Not killing the bulls made the Mexican people angry, which didn't help, since they were already angry that their own toreadors could not star in the film. At the end of filming, the unit manager, Walter Strohm convinced Thorpe to kill the bulls, even though they cost $1000 each.

Director of photography Sidney Wagner and one other crew member died of cholera after eating contaminated street food they had bought in town. Williams' husband, Ben Gage, was arrested after getting into a fight with an employee of the hotel at which the cast was staying, the same man who had recently shot the crew's doctor, who had yelled at him. Gage's arrest was covered by gossip columnist Hedda Hopper. Gage and the film's makeup artist George Lane were then declared persona non grata and wanted expelled from Mexico, but the company would be allowed to finish shooting the film. However, Williams knew that Lane would be fired when he returned to California, so she stalled shooting until he came back. Instead, the studio sent another makeup artist, Bill Tuttle to Mexico, and he promised Williams he would help Lane get another job.  In the film's bullring sequence, the capework concludes with the archaic and very rare "quite de la mariposa," or "butterfly takeaway."  Hemingway described this maneuver as he saw it performed in the 1920s and '30s by matador Marcial Lananda.  In 1983 Lalanda, now an octogenarian, described it in an interview on Television Española, as performed by matador Luis Francisco Espla.

The studio insisted that Williams wear a traje de luces matador outfit for the film. Traditionally, the suit is made to lie very flat on the toreador's chest, and this proved to be difficult. The tailor in Mexico refused to work on the suit unless Williams "agreed to have her bosom surgically removed." Strohm had the suit sent back to Irene, MGM's costume designer in Hollywood, to be fitted to her body, which included closing the fly with hooks. On the trage de luces, when worn by men, the fly is left slightly open, so the "world can appreciate what's in there."

The film features Williams in the water for one short sequence. This was a stark contrast with many of her box office hits, which all featured elaborate water sequences. Publicity photos for the film featuring Williams in a bathing suit were utilized much more than those of her in the traje de luces suit.

Reception

Box Office
The film earned $2,546,000 in the US and $3,089,000 elsewhere, resulting in a profit of $1,170,000.

Awards
Fiesta was nominated for Best Music, Scoring of a Musical Picture at the 1948 Academy Awards, but lost to Mother Wore Tights.

Home media
On October 6, 2009, Turner Entertainment released Fiesta on DVD as part of the Esther Williams Spotlight Collection, Volume 2. The 6 disc set was a follow up to the company's Esther Williams Spotlight Collection, Volume 1, and contains digitally remastered versions of several of Williams's films including Thrill of a Romance (1945), This Time for Keeps (1947), Pagan Love Song (1950), Million Dollar Mermaid (1952) and Easy to Love (1953).

See also

 1947 in film

References

External links

 
 
 
 

1947 films
1940s musical drama films
1947 romantic drama films
American musical drama films
American romantic drama films
American romantic musical films
Films about women's sports
Films directed by Richard Thorpe
Films scored by Johnny Green
Films set in Mexico
Films shot in Mexico
Metro-Goldwyn-Mayer films
Bullfighting films
1940s American films